Stephen Benedict Grummond (September 18, 1834  –  January 2, 1894) was a shipowner, marine industrialist, and the mayor of Detroit, Michigan.

Early life and business
Stephen Benedict Grummond was born on September 18, 1834 in Marine City, Michigan, the son of Stephen Benedict and Mary Harrow Grummond.  The elder Grummond was a successful businessman who ran a general store in Marine City.

Starting at age 15, the younger Grummond served on merchant ships in the summer and continued his schooling during the winter months. Using his savings and some investment from his father, Grummond purchased a merchant vessel of his own and sailed her for several years.  In 1855, he sold his first vessel, moved to Detroit, and purchased another; Grummond continued in the business of buying, selling, and operating various vessels.  He established Grummond's Mackinac Line of steamers, and at one time owned the largest tug and wrecking business on the Great Lakes.  He built up a great fortune, much of it in the tugging business, and expanded into barges, lumber, and Detroit real estate.

Politics and personal life
Grummond was originally a Democrat, but joined the Republican Party when it was established.  In 1879, he was elected a member of the Board of Estimates, and in 1881 was elected to the City Council.  Two years later he was elected as mayor of Detroit in a close race, and served in that capacity in 1884–1885.  Grummond ran again for a second term, and was narrowly defeated by Marvin H. Chamberlain.

In 1861, Grummond married Louisa B. Prouty; the couple had eleven children, seven of whom lived to adulthood: Mrs. Marie Graves, Nathaniel P. Grummond, U. Grant Grummond, Edith Grummond, and Edna Ora Grummond.

Stephen Benedict Grummond died at his home on January 2, 1894.

References

1834 births
1894 deaths
Mayors of Detroit
Detroit City Council members
People from Marine City, Michigan
Michigan Democrats
Michigan Republicans
19th-century American politicians